SACU or Sacu may refer to:
 Sacu - a commune in Caraș-Severin County
 SACU - Southern African Customs Union